Pope Field  is a public use airport located two nautical miles (4 km) northeast of the central business district of Greenfield, in Hancock County, Indiana, United States. It is privately owned by Pope Airport Inc.

Facilities and aircraft 
Pope Field covers an area of 42 acres (17 ha) at an elevation of 895 feet (273 m) above mean sea level. It has one runway designated 18/36 with a turf surface measuring 2,165 by 150 feet (660 x 46 m).

For the 12-month period ending December 31, 2010, the airport had 4,111 aircraft operations, an average of 11 per day: 99% general aviation and 1% military. At that time there were 14 aircraft based at this airport: 50% single-engine and 50% ultralight.

References

External links 
 Aerial image as of April 1998 from USGS The National Map
 

Airports in Indiana
Transportation buildings and structures in Hancock County, Indiana